Ayegui in Spanish or Aiegi in Basque is a town and municipality located in the province and autonomous community of Navarre, northern Spain.

Demography 
From:INE Archiv

References

External links
 Official web of the town 
 AYEGUI in the Bernardo Estornés Lasa - Auñamendi Encyclopedia (Euskomedia Fundazioa) 

Municipalities in Navarre